Edward Sherman Gould (11 May 1808 Litchfield, Connecticut - 21 February 1885 New York City) was a nineteenth-century United States author and critic.

Biography
He was the son of jurist James Gould, and an early contributor of tales to the Knickerbocker Magazine, to the New World, the Mirror, The Literary World, and other journals. His signature of "Cassio" in Charles King's American was at one time well-known.

In 1830 he lectured before the New York Mercantile Library Association on "American Criticism in American Literature". In his talk, he opposed the prevalent spirit of overflowing praise as injurious to the interests of the country.

His examination of correct use of English is the subject of several of his books, such as, Good English, or Popular Errors in Language (1867). At the time, there was great interest among many Victorian authors about the Germanic origin, evolution, and proper use of English, among criticism that continues into contemporary times.

Works
Translations:
 Alexandre Dumas, Travels in Egypt and Arabia Petraea (1839)
 Dupré, Progress of Democracy (1841)
 Honoré de Balzac, Eugénie Grandet (1841)
 Honoré de Balzac, Père Goriot (1842)
 Alexandre Dumas, Impressions of Travel in Switzerland
 Victor Hugo, Handsome Pecopin
 A. Royer, Charles de Bourbon (1842-1843)

In addition to contributing to many literary and theological journals, he wrote:

Abridgment of Alison's History of Europe (New York, 1843)
The Very Age, a comedy (1850)
John Doe and Richard Roe; or, Episodes of Life in New York (1862)
Good English, or Popular Errors in Language (1867)
Classical Elocution (1867)
Supplement to Duyckinck's History of the New World (1871)

References

Sources

1808 births
1885 deaths
American critics
French–English translators
19th-century American journalists
19th-century American translators
American male journalists
19th-century American male writers